The Boji Plains nothobranch (Nothobranchius bojiensis) is a species of fish (a killifish) in the family Nothobranchiidae, endemic to the drainage of the Ewaso Nyiro in Kenya. Its natural habitat is intermittent freshwater marshes.

References

Links
 Nothobranchius bojiensis on WildNothos

Boji Plains nothobranch
Fish described in 1992
Endemic freshwater fish of Kenya
Taxonomy articles created by Polbot